WWE No Mercy was a professional wrestling pay-per-view (PPV) event that was produced by WWE, a professional wrestling promotion based in Connecticut. The first No Mercy was held on May 16, 1999, in Manchester, England, and was the only No Mercy event produced in the United Kingdom. A second No Mercy was then held in October that year in Cleveland, Ohio, United States. Beginning with this second event, No Mercy became the annual October PPV until 2008. The event was then discontinued and replaced by Hell in a Cell in 2009. After eight years, No Mercy was reinstated in October 2016. However, No Mercy was again discontinued after the September 2017 event, as WWE reduced the amount of yearly PPVs held after they had ended the production of brand-exclusive PPVs following WrestleMania 34 in 2018. In addition to traditional PPV, the 2016 and 2017 events aired on the WWE Network.

The first four events were held when the promotion was still called the World Wrestling Federation (WWF). In May 2002, the promotion was renamed to World Wrestling Entertainment (WWE), and in 2011, the "WWE" name became an orphaned initialism for the promotion. During the first brand extension, No Mercy was held exclusively for the SmackDown brand from 2003 to 2006. When the event was reinstated for the second brand extension in 2016, it was again SmackDown-exclusive and was then Raw-exclusive for the final event in 2017.

History
On May 16, 1999, the then-World Wrestling Federation (WWF) held a pay-per-view (PPV) in the United Kingdom, specifically Manchester, England, titled No Mercy. The pay-per-view market was relatively new to Britain at the time: before One Night Only in 1997, all pay-per-view events were broadcast for free on Sky Sports. The UK-exclusive pay-per-views were established to serve as promotion for the new delivery method, however, were booked and treated similar to house shows. This first event would be the only No Mercy event produced in the United Kingdom, as the WWF held a second No Mercy later that same year on October 17, but in Cleveland, Ohio, United States. No Mercy continued as the annual October PPV for the promotion (with the May UK PPV renamed Insurrextion, held until 2003) until 2008. The event was then discontinued and replaced by Hell in a Cell in 2009, which became the annual October PPV.

In March 2002, the WWF introduced the brand extension, where the promotion divided its main roster into two brands, Raw and SmackDown!, where the wrestlers were exclusively assigned to perform—in May 2002, the WWF was renamed to World Wrestling Entertainment (WWE). The 2002 event, which was the first to be held under the WWE name, featured wrestlers from both the Raw and SmackDown! brands, but from 2003 to 2006, the PPV was produced exclusively for wrestlers from the SmackDown! brand. Following WrestleMania 23 in 2007, WWE discontinued brand-exclusive PPVs, thus the 2007 and 2008 events featured wrestlers from the Raw, SmackDown, and ECW brands—ECW was established as a third brand in 2006.

In February 2010, the ECW brand was disbanded. In April 2011, the promotion ceased using its full name, with the "WWE" name becoming an orphaned initialism for the promotion, and in August that year, the first brand extension ended. In July 2016, WWE reintroduced the brand extension, again dividing the roster between the Raw and SmackDown brands. No Mercy was reinstated that year for October and was again produced exclusively for SmackDown. The following year, it was moved up to September and produced exclusively for Raw. This 2017 event would be the final No Mercy event held, as following WrestleMania 34 in 2018, WWE again discontinued brand-exclusive PPVs, resulting in WWE reducing the amount of yearly PPVs produced.

Theme song
Jim Johnston, who was a long-time music composer for the promotion, wrote a song titled "No Mercy", which was used as a regular theme song for the events in 2002, 2004, 2006, and 2007. For the 2016 and 2017 events, the theme song was by KIT and was also titled "No Mercy."

Events

Notes

References

External links
Official Website

 
Recurring events established in 1999
Recurring events disestablished in 2008
Recurring events established in 2016
Recurring events disestablished in 2017